Tones of Town is the second studio album by indie rock band Field Music. It was released on 22 January 2007. "In Context" (w/b 'Off & On'), "A House Is Not a Home" (w/b 'Logic') and "She Can Do What She Wants" (w/b 'Sit Tighter', an alternate version of 'Sit Tight') were released as singles.

Track listing
"Give It Lose It Take It" – 3:56
"Sit Tight" – 3:02
"Tones of Town" – 3:06
"A House Is Not a Home" – 2:36
"Kingston" – 1:54
"Working to Work" – 2:51
"In Context" – 3:37
"A Gap Has Appeared" – 2:01
"Closer at Hand" – 2:30
"Place Yourself" – 3:01
"She Can Do What She Wants"/"Outro" – 3:07

Personnel
Field Music
Peter Brewis
David Brewis
Andrew Moore

Additional personnel
Emma Fisk – violins
Rachel Davis – violins
Peter Richardson – cello
Peter Gofton – vibraphone
Graeme Hopper – vibraphone

References

2007 albums
Field Music albums
Memphis Industries albums